St. Peter's Engineering College may refer to:

 St. Peter's Engineering College, Avadi
 St. Peter's Engineering College, Hyderabad